Wisembach is a commune in the Vosges department in Grand Est in northeastern France.

Etymology
The toponym Wisembach is of Germanic origin, deriving from High German wisa (cognate to modern German Wiese), denoting meadow. The Germanic hydronym *-bak(i) entered the French language via High German, and took on two forms: the Germanic form -bach and Romantic -bais.

Population

See also
Communes of the Vosges department

References

External links

Official site

Communes of Vosges (department)